Union County Jail may refer to:

Union County Jail (Blairsville, Georgia), listed on the National Register of Historic Places in Union County, Georgia
Union County Jail (Union, South Carolina), listed on the National Register of Historic Places in Union County, South Carolina
Union County Jail (New Jersey)